Premise is a claim that is a reason for, or an objection against, some other claim as part of an argument.

Premise (from the Latin praemissa [propositio], meaning "placed in front") may also refer to:

 Premises, land and buildings together considered as a property
 Premise (narrative), the situational logic driving the plot in plays
 Premise, a trade name for the insecticide Imidacloprid